Jag Singh is an Internet entrepreneur, angel investor and former American political strategist based in Berlin, Germany. He was previously the managing director of Techstars.

Career
He founded Labourhome, MessageSpace, and YouFundMe. LabourHome was acquired by the New Statesman Magazine in 2008.

In 2011, Singh worked as Director of Digital for the No To AV referendum campaign. Singh co-founded WESS Digital with Matthew Elliott, Paul Staines, and Andrew Whitehurst in 2013. The firm created a database based on issue-based campaigns to be used by political parties to analyse how people vote.

He was listed in Iain Dale and The Daily Telegraph's list of top 100 left wingers in 2008. In 2018, Singh was in the Financial Times list of the UK's top 100 black and minority ethnic leaders in technology.

References

Living people
Angel investors
Businesspeople from Berlin
American computer businesspeople
American Internet celebrities
English bloggers
1985 births
British male bloggers